Niel "Junjun" Causing Tupas Jr. is a Filipino lawyer and politician. He served as a member of the Philippine House of Representatives representing the 5th District of Iloilo from 2007 to 2016.

Personal life 
He is the husband of Atty. Yvonne Angeli Lee Tupas. He is the son of former Iloilo governor Niel Tupas Sr., brother of Barotac Viejo mayor Niel Tupas III, and brother of Iloilo City councilor Lex Tupas.

Education 
Tupas graduated from the University of the Philippines College of Law in 1998. He graduated in the top 20 of his batch. After graduating from law school, he promptly took the bar exams for the first and only time in September 1998 and successfully passed it with a strong general average of 83.05 percent. He obtained his degree in B.A.Political Science from the University of the Philippines, Diliman in 1993 and graduated magna cum laude. He was a consistent university scholar and was a member of the Pi Gamma Mu Honor Society.

Early career 
After passing the bar, he worked as an associate lawyer at the Belo Gozon Elma Parel Asuncion & Lucila Law Offices in Makati specializing in litigation and labor law. He was then promoted junior partner before he left the law firm to seek public office in 2004.

Political career 
He was elected No. 1 Board Member of the 5th District of Iloilo in 2004. Also in 2004, he was elected President of the National Movement of Young Legislators (NMYL), Western Visayas Chapter (Region VI). He was elected Congressman of the 5th District of Iloilo in 2007 and was re-elected in 2010 and 2013.

Tupas served as the Representative of the 5th District of Iloilo and a member of the Philippine Judicial and Bar Council (JBC). He is a member of the Liberal Party under the leadership of former President Benigno Aquino III. He was also the Chairman of the Committee on Justice in the House of Representatives. He was one of the prosecutors in the Impeachment Trial of Chief Justice Renato Corona.

Chief Justice Corona Impeachment 
He has been assigned to be lead prosecutor for the impeachment of Supreme Court Chief Justice Renato Corona. Trial  started on January 16, 2012, and ended May 29, 2012. An overwhelming majority of the senators voting 20–3, impeaching the former Chief Justice for when he was found guilty of "committing culpable violation of the Constitution and betraying the public trust."

References

External links 

1970 births
Living people
Lakas–CMD (1991) politicians
Lakas–CMD politicians
Liberal Party (Philippines) politicians
People from Iloilo
Members of the House of Representatives of the Philippines from Iloilo
University of the Philippines Diliman alumni